"Malo" is a song by Puerto Rican rappers and singers Anuel AA, Zion and Randy and was released on July 14, 2021. It was released as the first single from his fifth album LLNM2.

Background 
The song was officially previewed by Anuel AA in his Instagram profile. "I am happy to show you the first song of this production that has been made with a lot of love. Thanks to Zion and Randy for the collaboration, they are tough! Get ready because we will continue to break with more music," Anuel AA commented the song in a statement.

Music video 
The video was directed by TruViews and Anuel AA and was filmed in Miami, Dominican Republic and Puerto Rico. It shows Anuel, Zion and Randy dancing alongside 70 women. At the end of the music video, Anuel AA showed the alternative cover of his upcoming album LLNM2.

Charts

References  

2022 singles
Anuel AA songs